Caecum is a genus of minute sea snails, marine gastropod micromolluscs or micromollusks in the family Caecidae or blind shells.

Distribution
This genus occurs worldwide in warm and temperate seas. Many species live in sponges, in sandy spots on reefs, or in grassy beds in shallow waters in bays and lagoons. Some species are very common and can be extremely numerous where they do occur, such as the "beautiful caecum"(Caecum pulchellum), but even they can be easily overlooked as they are so tiny. Many species are considered to be uncommon, but this assessment may be a result of lack of proper sampling.

Shell description
The shells in this genus, like the others in the family, are very small with a length between 2 mm and 6 mm. Their colour is white to yellowish white and some are almost translucent. They are unusual in that the teleoconch of the adult shell is a curving tube for most of its length. In the first stage of the shell it is spiral-shaped but soon becomes cylindrical. 
The shell  is sealed with a permanent calcareous plug at one end and (when the animal has withdrawn into the shell) with a circular, multispiral, horny operculum at the other end, the shell aperture. The sculpture is smooth or consists of a close-set, large number of annular ridges.

Feeding habits
These snails feed on one-celled organisms on sand grains or pebbles.

Species
Species in the genus Caecum include:

 † Caecum aartseni Van Dingenen, Ceulemans & Landau, 2016 
 Caecum achirona (de Folin, 1867)
 Caecum adamsi Raines, 2020
 Caecum amputatum  Ch. Hedley, 1894 
 Caecum amydroglyptum  Rehder, 1980 
 Caecum angustum  de Folin, 1879
 Caecum annulatum Emmons, 1858
 Caecum antillarum Carpenter, 1858 - Antillean caecum
 Caecum arabicum Issel, 1869
 Caecum armoricum de Folin, 1869 - De Folin's lagoon snail. This species is fully protected in the United Kingdom under the Wildlife and Countryside Act 1981 since 1992.
 Caecum atlantidis  R. B. Watson, 1897 
 Caecum attenuatum  de Folin, 1879 
 Caecum auriculatum  de Folin, 1868 
 Caecum austrafricanum Vannozzi, Pizzini & Raines, 2015
 Caecum australe Pizzini & Raines, 2011
 Caecum bathus Pizzini, Raines & Vannozzi, 2013 
 † Caecum benhami Goedert & Raines, 2016 
 † Caecum bensoni Goedert & Raines, 2016 
 Caecum beaufortensis Ward and Blackwelder 1987   
 Caecum bimamillatum de Folin, 1867
 Caecum bimarginatum Carpenter, 1859
 Caecum bipartitum de Folin, 1870 
 Caecum borneoense de Folin, 1867
 Caecum bounty Pizzini & Raines, 2011
 Caecum brasilicum  de Folin, 1874 
 Caecum brennani Raines & Pizzini, 2009
 Caecum breve de Folin, 1867
 Caecum bucerium Golikov, 1967
 Caecum californicum Dall, 1885 - California caecum 
 Caecum calvertense  Martin, 1904  
 Caecum campanulatum Raines & Pizzini, 2005
 Caecum campe  Pilsbry and Olsson, 1941  
 Caecum carolinianum Dall, 1892 - Carolina caecum   
 † Caecum carpenteri Deshayes, 1861 
 Caecum caverna  Moolenbeek, Faber & Iliffe, 1989 
 Caecum chilense  Stuardo, 1962  
 Caecum chinense  de Folin, 1879 
 Caecum chipolanum  Gardner, 1947  
 Caecum cinctum Olsson & Harbison, 1953
 Caecum circumvolutum de Folin, 1867
 Caecum clarkii  P. P. Carpenter, 1858 
 Caecum clarum Lamy, 1910 [ex de Folin MS]
 Caecum clathratum  P. P. Carpenter, 1857  
 Caecum clava de Folin, 1867 - club caecum 
 Caecum cocoense Sibaja-Cordero, García-Méndez & Troncoso, 2013
 Caecum codoceoae Gálvez & Huidobro, 2017
 Caecum condylum Moore, 1969 - bone caecum
 Caecum continens  Van der Linden & Moolenbeek, 2000  
 Caecum cooki Pizzini & Raines, 2011
 Caecum cooperi S. I. Smith, 1860 - Cooper's Atlantic caecum
 Caecum corrugatulum Carpenter, 1857
 Caecum crassum de Folin, 1870
 Caecum crebricinctum Carpenter, 1864 - many-named caecum 
 Caecum crispum A. E. Verrill & Bush, 1900  
 Caecum crystallinum de Folin, 1880
 Caecum cubitatum (de Folin, 1868) - smooth caecum 
 Caecum cuspidatum Chaster, 1896  
 Caecum cycloferum de Folin, 1867 - fatlip caecum   
 Caecum dakuwaqa Pizzini, Raines & Vannozzi, 2013 
 Caecum dalli Bartsch, 1920
 Caecum danielei Pizzini & Raines, 2011
 Caecum debile A. E. Verrill & Bush, 1900
 Caecum delicatulum A. E. Verrill & Bush, 1900
 Caecum derjugini Golikov, 1967
 Caecum dextroversum  P. P. Carpenter, 1858 
 Caecum digitulum Hedley, 1904 
 Caecum diminutum  C. B. Adams, 1852 
 Caecum directum Vannozzi, 2019
 Caecum donmoorei Mitchell-Tapping, 1979 
 Caecum draperi Raines, 2020
 Caecum dux de Folin, 1871
 Caecum eburneum  C. B. Adams, 1852  
 Caecum egenum Vannozzi, 2017
 Caecum elegantissimum Carpenter, 1859
 Caecum eliezeri Absalao, 1997 
 Caecum elongatum  P. P. Carpenter, 1857 
 Caecum engli  Nofroni, Pizzini, Oliverio, 1997 
 Caecum eunoi  Nofroni, Pizzini, Oliverio, 1997 
 Caecum exile  de Folin, 1875 
 Caecum farcimen  P. P. Carpenter, 1857 
 Caecum fijiense Pizzini, Raines & Vannozzi, 2013 
 Caecum firmatum  C. B. Adams, 1852  
 Caecum floridanum Stimpson, 1851 - Florida caecum
 Caecum folini Kisch, 1959 
 Caecum frugi Vannozzi, 2019
 Caecum galapagoense Raines, 2020
 Caecum geigeri Pizzini & Raines, 2011
 Caecum glabellum A. Adams, 1868
 Caecum glabriforme Carpenter, 1857
 Caecum glabrum (Montagu, 1803)
 Caecum gofasi Pizzini & Nofroni, 2001
 Caecum granulatum Vannozzi, 2019
 Caecum greensboroense  Martin, 1904  
 Caecum gulosum Hedley, 1899
 Caecum gurgulio Carpenter, 1858 - windpipe caecum   
 Caecum hemphilli Bartsch, 1920  
 Caecum heptagonum (Bartsch, 1920)
 Caecum heterochromum Raines & Pizzini, 2005
 Caecum hyalinum Vannozzi, 2022
 Caecum imbricatum Carpenter, 1858 - imbricate caecum 
 Caecum incisum Vannozzi, Pizzini & Raines, 2015 
 Caecum imperforatum Kanamacher, 1798    (nomen dubium)
 Caecum inclinatum de Folin, 1869
 Caecum infimum de Folin, 1867
 Caecum inflatulum Vannozzi, 2017
 Caecum inflatum de Folin, 1867
 Caecum inhacaense Albano & Pizzini 2011
 Caecum insculptum Carpenter, 1857
 Caecum insularum Moore, 1969    
 Caecum intortum Vannozzi, Pizzini & Raines, 2015
 Caecum japonicum (Habe, 1978)
 Caecum johnsoni Winkley, 1908
 Caecum jonatani Espinosa, Ortea & Fernandez-Garcés, 2007
 Caecum jucundum de Folin, 1867
 Caecum knysnaense Vannozzi, Pizzini & Raines, 2015
 Caecum kontiki Pizzini & Raines, 2011
 Caecum laeve C.B. Adams, 1852
 Caecum lapita Pizzini, Raines & Vannozzi, 2013 
 Caecum laqueatum  C. B. Adams, 1852 
 † Caecum larieyense Lozouet, Lesport & Renard, 2001 
 Caecum leilae Vannozzi, Pizzini & Raines, 2015
 Caecum lightfootanum Raines, 2020
 Caecum limnetes Long, 1972
 Caecum limpidum de Folin, 1874
 Caecum lindae Vannozzi, Pizzini & Raines, 2015
 Caecum lineicinctum de Folin, 1880
 Caecum liratocinctum Carpenter, 1857
 Caecum lohri Strong & Hertlein, 1939
 Caecum loyaltense Pizzini, Raines & Vannozzi, 2013 
 Caecum lucidum de Folin, 1867
 Caecum macrum  Van der Linden & Moolenbeek, 2000 
  Caecum maestratii Pizzini, Raines & Vannozzi, 2013  
 Caecum magellanicum di Geronimo, Privitera & Valdovinos, 1995
 Caecum malleatum de Folin, 1867
 † Caecum mammillatum S. V. Wood, 1848 
 Caecum maori Pizzini & Raines, 2006
 Caecum maraisi Vannozzi, Pizzini & Raines, 2015
 Caecum marginatum de Folin, 1869
 Caecum marmoratum de Folin, 1869
 Caecum massambabense  Absalao, 1994 
 Caecum mauritianum de Folin, 1867
 Caecum metamorphosicum S. Lima, Santos & Absalão, 2013
 Caecum mexicanum Collins, 1937  
 Caecum microstriatum Pizzini, Raines & Vannozzi, 2013 
 † Caecum mineuri Lozouet, 1999 
 Caecum mirificum  de Folin, 1867 
 Caecum modestum de Folin, 1867
 Caecum monstrosum  C. B. Adams, 1852
 Caecum moorei (Marincovich, 1973)
 Caecum morgan Vannozzi, Pizzini & Raines, 2015
 Caecum multicostatum de Folin, 1867
  Caecum musorstomi Pizzini, Raines & Vannozzi, 2013 
 Caecum nasutum Vannozzi, 2019
 † Caecum nemoralis Lozouet, 2015 
 Caecum neocaledonicum de Folin, 1867
 Caecum neoguineanum Vannozzi, 2019
 Caecum nofronii Vannozzi, 2019
 Caecum oahuense  H. A. Pilsbry, 1921  
 Caecum obtusum Carpenter, 1857
 Caecum occidentale (Bartsch, 1920) - western caecum   
 Caecum orcutti (Dall, 1885)
 Caecum paradoxum  de Folin, 1867 
 Caecum parvum  C. B. Adams, 1852  
 Caecum pascuanum Raines & Pizzini, 2005
 † Caecum pertenuis Laws, 1941 
 Caecum planum de Folin, 1874
 Caecum patuxentium Martin, 1904  
 Caecum plicatum Carpenter, 1858 - plicate caecum   
 Caecum pollicare Carpenter, 1859
 Caecum praegrande Vannozzi, 2017
 Caecum profundicolum Bartsch, 1920 - deepwater caecum 
 Caecum properegulare Mansfield, 1925  
 Caecum pulchellum Stimpson, 1851 - beautiful caecum 
 Caecum pygmaeum  C. B. Adams, 1852 
 Caecum quadratum  P. P. Carpenter, 1857 
 Caecum rapanuiense Raines & Pizzini, 2005
 Caecum regulare Carpenter, 1858
 Caecum rehderi Raines & Pizzini, 2005
 Caecum reversum Carpenter, 1857
 Caecum richthofeni  A. M. Strong & J. G. Hertlein, 1939 
 Caecum rijgersmai  Jong & Coomans, 1988 
 Caecum rolani Pizzini & Nofroni, 2001
 Caecum rosanum Bartsch, 1920 
 Caecum rostratum de Folin, 1881
 Caecum ruggerii  Pizzini, 1997   
 Caecum rugulosum  Phil, 1836   
 Caecum ryssotitum de Folin, 1867 - minute caecum
 Caecum searleswoodii Carpenter, 1859
 Caecum semilaeve Carpenter, 1857
 Caecum senegambianum de Folin, 1870
 Caecum sepimentum  de Folin, 1868 
 Caecum shaskyi Raines, 2020
 Caecum simplicissimum Thiele, 1925
 Caecum sinuatum de Folin, 1867
 Caecum skoglundae Pizzini, Raines & Nofroni, 2007
 Caecum smriglioi Pizzini, Nofroni & Bonfitto, 2008
 Caecum someri (de Folin, 1867)
 Caecum spiculum Raines, 2020
 Caecum striatum  de Folin, 1875
 Caecum strictum de Folin, 1871
 Caecum strigosum de Folin, 1868
 Caecum subannulatum de Folin, 1870
 Caecum subaustrale Stuardo, 1970
 Caecum subconicum Carpenter, 1857
 Caecum subcylindratum Pizzini, Raines & Vannozzi, 2013 
 Caecum subflavum  de Folin, 1879 
 Caecum subimpressum  P. P. Carpenter, 1857 
 Caecum subobsoletum Carpenter, 1857
 Caecum subornatum  de Folin, 1874 
 Caecum subspirale Carpenter, 1857
 Caecum subquadratum Carpenter, 1859
 Caecum subspirale Carpenter, 1857
 Caecum subvolutum de Folin, 1874
 Caecum succineum  de Folin, 1879  
 Caecum swinneni  Nofroni, Pizzini, Oliverio, 1997 
 Caecum taeniatum de Folin, 1869
 Caecum tahitianum Pizzini & Raines, 2011
 Caecum tenue Verrill & Bush, 1900
 Caecum tenuicostatum de Folin, 1881
 Caecum tenuiliratum Carpenter, 1857
 † Caecum tenuistriatum O. Boettger, 1869 
 Caecum teres Carpenter, 1857
 Caecum textile de Folin, 1867 - textile caecum
 Caecum tornatum A. E. Verrill & Bush, 1900 
 Caecum torquetum de Folin, 1867
 Caecum tortile Dall, 1892 - twisted caecum
 Caecum trachea G. Montagu, 1803 
 Caecum trindadense S. Lima, Santos & Absalão, 2013
 Caecum troglodyta  Moolenbeek, Faber & Iliffe, 1989 
 † Caecum tumidum Carpenter, 1858 
 Caecum uncinatum  de Folin, 1867 
 Caecum undatum  P. P. Carpenter, 1857 
 Caecum vanuatuarum Pizzini, Raines & Vannozzi, 2013 
 Caecum varanoi Pizzini, Nofroni & Bonfitto, 2008
 Caecum variegatum de Folin, 1867
 Caecum venosum de Folin, 1867
 † Caecum verai Moreno, Peñas & Rolán, 2003
 Caecum vertebrale  Ch. Hedley, 1899 
 Caecum vicinum de Folin, 1870
 Caecum virginiae Pizzini, Raines & Vannozzi, 2013 
 Caecum vitreum  P. P. Carpenter, 1858 
 Caecum wami Raines & Pizzini, 2009
 Caecum wayae Pizzini & Nofroni, 2001
 Caecum zaagmani  Jong and Coomans, 1988 

 Subgenera brought into synonymy 
 Caecum (Defolinia) Weisbord, 1962: synonym of Caecum Fleming, 1813
 Caecum (Meioceras) Carpenter, 1859: synonym of Meioceras Carpenter, 1859

Species brought into synonymy
 Caecum abnormale Carpenter, 1857: synonym of Caecum subspirale Carpenter, 1857
 Caecum amaltheanum Hedley, 1899: synonym of Mauroceras legumen (Hedley, 1899)
 Caecum amamiense Habe, 1978: synonym of Mauroceras amamiense (Habe, 1978)
 Caecum arcuatum   de Folin, 1867 : synonym of Caecum sepimentum de Folin, 1868
 Caecum bahiahondaense  A. M. Strong & J. G. Hertlein, 1939  : synonym of Caecum clathratum Carpenter, 1857
 Caecum bakeri (Bartsch, 1920): synonym of Caecum dextroversum Carpenter, 1857
 Caecum berthae Lange de Morretes, 1954: synonym of Caecum plicatum Carpenter, 1858
 Caecum biminicola Pilsbry, 1951: synonym of Caecum plicatum Carpenter, 1858
 Caecum buccina de Folin, 1870: synonym of Caecum circumvolutum de Folin, 1867
 Caecum bucheri Parenzan, 1979: synonym of Filogranula annulata (O. G. Costa, 1861)
 Caecum butoti  Jong & Coomans, 1988 : synonym of Caecum marmoratum de Folin, 1869
 Caecum capitanum de Folin, 1874: synonym of Caecum pulchellum Stimpson, 1851
 Caecum carmenense de Folin, 1870: synonym of Caecum circumvolutum de Folin, 1867
 Caecum carpenteri (Bartsch, 1920): synonym of Caecum adamsi Raines, 2020
 Caecum cayoense Rehder, 1943: synonym of Caecum floridanum Stimpson, 1851
 Caecum clenchi Olsson & McGinty, 1958: synonym of Caecum cycloferum de Folin, 1867
 Caecum compactum P. P. Carpenter, 1857 : synonym of Caecum quadratum Carpenter, 1857
 Caecum conjunctum de Folin, 1867: synonym of Caecum pulchellum Stimpson, 1851
 Caecum contractum de Folin, 1870: synonym of Caecum bipartitum de Folin, 1870
 Caecum corneum  R. W. Dunker, 1875 : synonym of Caecum ryssotitum de Folin, 1867
 Caecum cornucopiae (Carpenter, 1858) - horn-of-plenty caecum : synonym of Meioceras cornucopiae Carpenter, 1859
 Caecum coronatum de Folin, 1867: synonym of Caecum imbricatum Carpenter, 1858
 Caecum coronellum Dall, 1892: synonym of Caecum cycloferum de Folin, 1867
 Caecum costatum A. E. Verrill, 1872: synonym of Caecum cooperi S. I. Smith, 1860
 Caecum crassicostum Gabb, 1881: synonym of Caecum floridanum Stimpson, 1851
 Caecum curtatum de Folin, 1867: synonym of Caecum pulchellum Stimpson, 1851
 Caecum decussatum de Folin, 1869: synonym of Caecum plicatum Carpenter, 1858
 Caecum dux de Folin, 1871: synonym of Caecum floridanum Stimpson, 1851
 Caecum eburneum de Folin, 1886: synonym of Caecum folini Kisch, 1959 
 Caecum elagans Deregaslavtseva, 1891: synonym of Caecum trachea (Montagu, 1803)
 Caecum elegans  Perejoslavitseva, 1831 : synonym of Caecum trachea (Montagu, 1803)
 Caecum fasciatum de Folin, 1876: synonym of Caecum trachea (Montagu, 1803)
 Caecum formulosum de Folin, 1869: synonym of Caecum imbricatum Carpenter, 1858
 Caecum fulvum Kisch, 1959: synonym of Caecum neocaledonicum de Folin, 1867
 Caecum heladum Olsson and Harbison, 1953 - fine-line caecum  : synonym of Caecum multicostatum de Folin, 1867
 Caecum heterapex  T. Habe, 1963 : synonym of Caecum clarum Lamy, 1910 
 Caecum hinoidei  T. Habe, 1978 : synonym of Caecum neocaledonicum de Folin, 1867
 Caecum insigne de Folin, 1867: synonym of Caecum imbricatum Carpenter, 1858
 Caecum instructum de Folin, 1870: synonym of Caecum bipartitum de Folin, 1870
 Caecum irregulare de Folin, 1867: synonym of Caecum floridanum Stimpson, 1851
 Caecum legumen Hedley, 1904: synonym of Meioceras legumen (Hedley, 1904)
 Caecum leptoglyphos de Folin, 1881: synonym of Caecum textile de Folin, 1867
 Caecum lermondi Dall, 1924: synonym of Meioceras nitidum (Stimpson, 1851)
 Caecum lightfootae  Pizzini, Nofroni, Oliverio, 1994 : synonym of Caecum atlantidis Watson, 1897
 Caecum lilianum  Ch. Hedley, 1903 : synonym of Caecum sepimentum de Folin, 1867
 Caecum maculatum  T. Habe, 1963 : synonym of Caecum sepimentum de Folin, 1867
 Caecum malleatum var. sublaevis de Folin, 1868: synonym of Caecum modestum de Folin, 1868 
 Caecum microcyclus de Folin, 1879 : synonym of Caecum attenuatum de Folin, 1880 (subsequent spelling)
 Caecum nitidum Stimpson, 1851 - little horn caecum: synonym of Meioceras nitidum (Stimpson, 1851)  
 Caecum obesum A. E. Verrill & Bush, 1900 : synonym of Caecum plicatum Carpenter, 1858
 Caecum orientale de Folin, 1868 : synonym of Caecum clarkii Carpenter, 1859
 Caecum phronimum de Folin, 1867 : synonym of Caecum floridanum Stimpson, 1851
 Caecum puntagordanum Weisbord, 1962: synonym of Caecum floridanum Stimpson, 1851
 Caecum putnamense Mansfield, 1924 : synonym of Caecum johnsoni Winkley, 1908
 Caecum rotundum de Folin, 1868 : synonym of Meioceras nitidum (Stimpson, 1851)
 Caecum saavedrae Beltran, 1965 : synonym of Caecum auriculatum de Folin, 1868
 Caecum sardinianum de Folin, 1869 : synonym of Caecum clarkii Carpenter, 1859
 Caecum sculptum de Folin, 1881: synonym of  Caecum imbricatum Carpenter, 1858
 Caecum semitracheum  S. Brusina, 1865 : synonym of Caecum clarkii Carpenter, 1859
 Caecum smithi Cooper, 1872: synonym of Caecum cooperi S. Smith, 1860
 Caecum solitarium  Oliver, 1915 : synonym of Caecum maori Pizzini & Raines, 2006
 Caecum syriacum de Folin, 1869: synonym of Caecum auriculatum de Folin, 1868
 Caecum tenue A. E. Verrill & Bush, 1900: synonym of Caecum armoricum de Folin, 1869
 Caecum termes Heilprin, 1889: synonym of Caecum plicatum Carpenter, 1858
 Caecum tomaculum  (Weisbord, 1962) : synonym of Caecum ryssotitum de Folin, 1867
 Caecum triornatum de Folin, 1870: synonym of Caecum bipartitum de Folin, 1870
 Caecum uvea Pizzini, Raines & Vannozzi, 2013: synonym of Caecum folini Kisch, 1959 
 Caecum veracruzanum Collins, 1937 : synonym of Caecum circumvolutum de Folin, 1867
 Caecum vestitum de Folin, 1868 - Vera Cruz caecum: synonym of Caecum circumvolutum de Folin, 1867
 Nomina dubia 
 Caecum abreviatum de Folin, 1870 
 Caecum bicinctum de Folin, 1870 
 Caecum gracile Carpenter, 1858 
 Caecum hemisphericum de Folin, 1867 
 Caecum imperforatum (Kanmacher, 1798)

References

 Vaught, K.C. (1989). A classification of the living Mollusca. American Malacologists: Melbourne, FL (USA). . XII, 195 pp
 Gofas, S.; Le Renard, J.; Bouchet, P. (2001). Mollusca, in: Costello, M.J. et al. (Ed.) (2001). European register of marine species: a check-list of the marine species in Europe and a bibliography of guides to their identification. Collection Patrimoines Naturels, 50: pp. 180–213
 Spencer, H.; Marshall. B. (2009). All Mollusca except Opisthobranchia. In: Gordon, D. (Ed.) (2009). New Zealand Inventory of Biodiversity. Volume One: Kingdom Animalia. 584 pp
 Aartsen, J. J. van (1977). Revision of the East Atlantic and Mediterranean Caecidae. - Basteria 41 (1/4): 7-19

External links 
 Moore, Donald R., The Systematic Position of the Family Caecidae (Mollusca: Gastropoda) , Bulletin of Marine Science, Volume 12, Number 4, 1962 ,pp. 695-701(7)
 Moore, Donald R., Ecological and Systematic Notes on Caecidae from St. Croix, U.S. Virgin Islands, Bulletin of Marine Science, Volume 22, Number 4, December 1972 , pp. 881-899(19) 
 Powell A. W. B., New Zealand Mollusca, William Collins Publishers Ltd, Auckland, New Zealand 1979 
 Shell-bearing Mollusca: : Caecidae
 Malacolog Version 4.1.0 : A Database of Western Atlantic Marine Mollusca
 The Paleobiology Database : Classification of the Caecidae
 Goedert J.L. & Raines B.K. (2016). First Paleogene Caecidae (Gastropoda: Truncatelloidea) from the northeastern Pacific Ocean and the earliest record for the genus Caecum Fleming, 1813. Proceedings of the Biological Society of Washington. 129: 38-47

Caecidae
Gastropod genera